Crveno Selo is a neighborhood of the Mali Bajmok district of Subotica in Serbia. It is populated largely by the Bunjevac minority, and has population of approximately 650.

References

External links
 Subotica official website

Subotica
Neighbourhoods in Serbia